Nery Bareiro (born 3 March 1988) is a Paraguayan footballer who plays as a centre back for Confiança. In 2006, he won the Milk Cup with Paraguay's under-20 team.

Career
Bareiro began playing at the football school of Olimpia Asunción before joining the youth divisions of Club Libertad in 2003. In 2005, he was part of Libertad's U17 and U20 squads and in 2006 he was part of Libertad's U19 and U20 squads.

Career statistics
(Correct )

International career
Bareiro represented the Paraguay national under-17 football team at the first South American U16 Championship held in 2004 in Paraguay, where Paraguay were crowned champions. He also captained the under-17 team at the 2005 South American Under-17 Football Championship. Bareiro captained the Paraguay national under-20 football team at the 2006 Milk Cup held in Northern Ireland, where Paraguay were crowned champions, scoring in the 43rd minute in a 2–0 victory over the USA.

He also captained the squad at the 2007 South American Youth Championship.

Titles
 Libertad
 Primera División: 2007, 2012

References

External links
 
 Tacuary Official Website Profile
 Profile at BDFA 

1988 births
Living people
Paraguayan footballers
Paraguayan expatriate footballers
Paraguay under-20 international footballers
Club Libertad footballers
Club Tacuary footballers
Sportivo Luqueño players
Deportivo Cali footballers
OFI Crete F.C. players
Atlético Junior footballers
Club Guaraní players
Coritiba Foot Ball Club players
Associação Chapecoense de Futebol players
Club Sportivo San Lorenzo footballers
Deportivo Binacional FC players
Paraguayan Primera División players
Categoría Primera A players
Super League Greece players
Campeonato Brasileiro Série A players
Peruvian Primera División players
Association football defenders
Paraguayan expatriate sportspeople in Colombia
Paraguayan expatriate sportspeople in Greece
Paraguayan expatriate sportspeople in Brazil
Paraguayan expatriate sportspeople in Peru
Expatriate footballers in Colombia
Expatriate footballers in Greece
Expatriate footballers in Brazil
Expatriate footballers in Peru